The ocellated frogfish, Fowlerichthys ocellatus, is a frogfish of the family Antennariidae, found in the western Atlantic including the eastern portion of the Gulf of Mexico, and the Caribbean Sea, to depths of 150 m.  Its grows to a length of  TL.

All Frogfish have unique characteristics compared to other fish, they stated that, it usually has “…first and second dorsal-fin spines, some or all fins fringed with red, and a unique combination of fin-ray and vertebral counts (2014). \

References
 
Arnold, R. J., Harcourt, R., Pietsch, T. W., (2014). A New Genus and Species of the Frogfish Family from Family Antennariidae (Teleostei: Lophiiformes: Antennariid) from New South Wales, Australia, with a Diagnosis and Key to the Genera of Histiophyrninae. Copeia.(3),534-539. 10.1643/Cl-13-155
Pietsch, T. W., Arnold, J. R. (2017). The “Lembeh Frogfish” Identified: Redescription of Nudiantennarius subteres (Smith and Redcliffe, in Radcliffe, 1912) (Teleostei: Lophiiformes: Antennariid). Copeia. 105.(4),657-663. 10.1643/Cl-17-651

Antennariidae
Fish of the Atlantic Ocean
Fish described in 1801